Litorilituus is a genus of bacteria from the family Colwelliaceae with one known species (Litorilituus sediminis). Litorilituus sediminis has been isolated from sediments from an amphioxus breeding zone in Qingdao in China.

References

Alteromonadales
Bacteria genera
Monotypic bacteria genera